Alejandro Bustos Sánchez (born 17 March 1997) is a Spanish water polo player. He competed in the 2020 Summer Olympics.

References

1997 births
Living people
Water polo players from the Community of Madrid
Sportspeople from Madrid
Water polo players at the 2020 Summer Olympics
Spanish male water polo players
Olympic water polo players of Spain
World Aquatics Championships medalists in water polo
21st-century Spanish people